C100 may refer to:
 Alcotán C-100, an anti-tank rocket launcher model
 Chase-Sisley C100-S, a glider
 Honda Super Cub C100 motorcycle
 CIOO-FM, a Canadian radio station
 Equal Remuneration Convention, 1951
 Canon EOS C100, a digital cinema camera made by Canon
 Adtranz C-100, a people mover manufactured by Adtranz, now Bombardier Transportation.